Meridian Czernowitz is a project of the Chernivtsi regional public organization "Cultural Capital", which deals with literary management and aims to return Chernivtsi to the cultural map of Europe.

Since 2012, it has positioned itself as the International Literary Corporation, which includes:

 Meridian Czernowitz International Poetry Festival (held in early September in Chernivtsi)
 Meridian Lutsk International Poetry Festival (first held on 6–8 October 2017 in Lutsk)
 Meridian Poltava International Poetry Festival (first held on 8–10 June 2018 in Poltava)
 book projects
 Paul-Celan-Literaturzentrum

Description 
The main goal of the Meridian Czernowitz festival is to return Chernivtsi to the cultural map of Europe and to develop a dialogue between contemporary Ukrainian poets and their foreign colleagues.

The festival program consists of poetic readings, public discussions, lectures, exhibitions of photo poetry and sculptures related to poetry, theatrical and musical performances, book presentations, video poetry, poetry in animation, poetic slams, electropoetry, youth scene, etc.

Festival participants 
Participants of the festival are poets, musicians and artists from Germany, Austria, Switzerland, Moldova, Ukraine, Russia, Poland, Romania, Israel, France, Great Britain and the US. Selected works of the authors participating in the festival are published annually in a separate collection of poems in the original languages and translated by Mark Belorusets (Ukraine), Claudia Dathe (Germany), Petro Rychlo (Ukraine), Beatrix Kersten (Germany), Chrystina Nazarkevych (Ukraine) and others.

The festival is also a platform for the presentation of Ukrainian poets and writers at literary forums in Europe and the world, including the Poesiefestival Berlin, the Leipzig Book Fair, the Frankfurt Book Fair and others.

Meridian Czernowitz initiative group and working team 
Meridian Czernowitz's initiative group includes: poet, publicist, Radio Liberty journalist Ihor Pomerantsev, writer, essayist and translator Yuriy Andrukhovych, literary critic Petro Rychlo, translator Mark Belorusets, public figure Svyatoslav Pomerantsev, poet, novelist, publicist and translator Serhiy Zhadan, human rights activist and public figure Yosyf Zisels, PhD in History, public figure, Honorary Consul of Austria in Chernivtsi Serhiy Osachuk.

The president of the International Literary Corporation Meridian Czernowitz is Sviatoslav Pomerantsev, the vice-president of Meridian Czernowitz (from 2013 to the present) and the curator of the international projects of the corporation is Yevhenia Lopata, the press secretary – Lilia Shutyak.

The festival is organized by the Chernivtsi regional public organization "Cultural Capital". Festival partners are: Federal Foreign Office of Germany, Chernivtsi City Council, Yuriy Fedkovych Chernivtsi National University, embassies of participating countries, Goethe-Institut, Austrian Cultural Forum, Swiss Cultural Foundation Pro Helvetia, Haus für Poesie (Berlin, Germany), Ukrainian-Jewish Meeting Foundation and other cultural foundations and cultural institutions.

Book projects 
Meridian Czernowitz is not a publishing house in the traditional sense – there is no staff, office, production and warehouses. For each of the book projects, the organizers involve specialists who work with the author's manuscript.

Meridian Czernowitz publishes literary texts by contemporary authors. Usually five to seven titles are published during the year, including books in Ukrainian, Russian and bilingual (German-Ukrainian). Among the authors are Yuriy Andrukhovych, Igor Pomerantsev, Oksana Zabuzhko, Serhiy Zhadan, Taras Prokhasko, Yuriy Izdryk, Andriy Bondar, Taras Malkovych, Dmytro Lazutkin, Ostap Slyvynsky , Andriy Lyubka, Hryhoriy Semenchuk, Bohdana Matiash, Irena Karpa, Kateryna Babkina, Ada Rogovtseva, Anatoliy Vyshevsky, Borys Khersonskiy, Andriy Tuzhikov, Nadiya Kushko, Olena Andreychikova, Peter Zalmayev, Kateryna Kalytko, Volodymyr Rafeenko, Artem Chekh, Iryna Tsilyk.  In addition, translations by Robert Walzer, Tadeusz Dombrowski, Pedro Lenz, and Paul Celan are published. In 2010–2012, the Almanac of Poems and Translations of the festival was published.

See also
List of publishing companies of Ukraine

References

External links 

 Official website

Publishing companies of Ukraine
2012 establishments in Ukraine
Culture in Chernivtsi
Arts in Ukraine